Martín Roberto Mandra (born 20 December 1975) is an Argentine former professional footballer who played as a forward.

Club career
Born in Buenos Aires, Mandra began his career in the youth ranks of storied Argentine club Racing Club. He made his first appearance in the Clausura 1995 tournament. For the 1996–1997 season he was loaned out to second division side Nueva Chicago where he would net 15 goals in 27 appearances. He then returned to Racing but than would begin a series of moves to various clubs throughout the world. He joined Ferro Carril Oeste in 1998 where he was a prominent player netting 11 goals in 51 First Division matches. For the 1999–2000 season Mandra moved to Europe to Madrid club Rayo Vallecano. Mandra received little playing time for Rayo and moved to Greek side Paniliakos at the conclusion of the season. Mandra enjoyed success in Greece, he netted 6 goals in 23 matches. However, after one season in Greece he would return to Argentina to his former club Nueva Chicago, he enjoyed success at the club and than moved on to yet another club in his native land Rosario Central. After two successful seasons in Argentina, Mandra was recruited to play for 2. Bundesliga side 1. FC Nürnberg. After two unhappy months in Germany, Mandra returned to Argentina. For the 2004 season Mandra would sign with Peruvian side Universidad San Martín, the club was in the middle of a battle to avoid relegation and Mandra's 5 goals in 18 appearances helped San Martin remain in the First Division.

Mandra continued with his career as a football nomad as he returned to Argentina in 2005 with Huracán and Belgrano. After receiving an offer to return to Europe, Mandra agreed to join Spanish Segunda División B side UD Melilla as the club's star signing. Mandra had an up and down stay with Melilla, which included questions regarding his Italian passport. Once these issues were resolved he was unable to regain his first team place, and was sold to Italian side Barletta. After a short stay in Italy, Mandra would begin the most successful part of his career. He would sign with Ecuadorian side Deportivo Azogues in 2007 where he scored 11 goals in 21 appearances. This piqued the interest of the top clubs in Ecuador, and for the 2008 season Mandra signed with Deportivo Quito. With Quito Mandra became an adored player as he helped the club to their first league title in 40 years. Mandra was the league's second leading scorer netting 17 goals in 34 league matches. He also participated in the Copa Sudamericana for Deportivo Quito.

Statistics

Honours
S.D. Quito
 Serie A de Ecuador: Campeonato Ecuatoriano de Fútbol Serie A 2008

References

External links
 Statistics
 Argentina First Division statistics  
 footballplus.com

1975 births
Living people
Argentine footballers
Association football forwards
Footballers from Buenos Aires
Argentine Primera División players
Primera Nacional players
La Liga players
Super League Greece players
Peruvian Primera División players
Ecuadorian Serie A players
Racing Club de Avellaneda footballers
Club de Gimnasia y Esgrima La Plata footballers
Nueva Chicago footballers
Ferro Carril Oeste footballers
Rosario Central footballers
Club Atlético Huracán footballers
Club Atlético Belgrano footballers
UD Melilla footballers
Rayo Vallecano players
Paniliakos F.C. players
1. FC Nürnberg players
1. FC Nürnberg II players
Club Deportivo Universidad de San Martín de Porres players
S.D. Quito footballers
Argentine expatriate footballers
Argentine expatriate sportspeople in Spain
Expatriate footballers in Spain
Argentine expatriate sportspeople in Greece
Expatriate footballers in Greece
Argentine expatriate sportspeople in Germany
Expatriate footballers in Germany
Argentine expatriate sportspeople in Peru
Expatriate footballers in Peru
Argentine expatriate sportspeople in Ecuador
Expatriate footballers in Ecuador